Kohlian is a village in Sargodha District in the Punjab Province of Pakistan. It is located at 32°26'0N 72°50'0E with an altitude of 190 metres (626 feet).

References

Populated places in Sargodha District

muhammad yousaf of kohlian 
mobile No 0323-4544786